is a Japanese footballer who plays as a right back for FC Tokyo.

Career
Suzuki signed for Fujieda MYFC on 10 December 2018.

Club statistics
Updated to 26 December 2021.

Honours
 Blaublitz Akita
 J3 League (1): 2020

References

External links

 Fujieda profile
 Profile at Akita
 FuPa profile
 Kicker profile
 Waseda University profile
 Waseda University interview

1996 births
Living people
Japanese footballers
Japanese expatriate footballers
Japanese expatriate sportspeople in Germany
Expatriate footballers in Germany
Association football defenders
Waseda University alumni
VfR Aalen players
Fujieda MYFC players
Blaublitz Akita players
3. Liga players
J3 League players